The current capital of Myanmar (Burma) is Nay Pyi Taw. The following is a list of political capitals of notable states in Burmese history from the 9th century to the present. The list is generally organised in dynastic and chronological orders. National capitals are shown in bold

List of capitals

See also

Notes

References

Bibliography
 
 
 
 
 
 
 
 
 
 
 
 
 

Myanmar
Government of Myanmar
Myanmar history-related lists
Lists of places in Myanmar